Mike Cunningham (born January 8, 1947) is an American politician. He is a member of the Missouri State Senate, having served since 2013. He was a member of the Missouri House of Representatives from 2003 to 2011, serving the 145th House District. He is a member of the Republican Party.

Electoral history

State Representative

State Senate

References

Living people
Republican Party members of the Missouri House of Representatives
1947 births
21st-century American politicians